Mirko Šundov (born 15 January 1962) is a Croatian General who served as a Chief of General Staff of the Armed Forces of the Republic of Croatia from 2016 until 2020.

Early life and education
Mirko Šundov was born on 15 January 1962 in a small village of Bračević in municipality of Muć near Split. He graduated defense in 1986 from the Faculty of Political Science of the University of Sarajevo. He gained his master's degree in 1999 in the field of Geo-sciences, branch Physical Geography, from the Faculty of Science of the University of Zagreb. In 2001, Šundov graduated from the National War College "Ban Josip Jelačić". In 2007, he gained his PhD in the field of Geo-sciences, branch Physical Geography, from the Faculty of Science of the University of Zagreb.

Career
After graduation in 1986, Šundov started working as a Special Adviser in the Croatian Territorial Defense HQs in Split. During the Croatian War of Independence (1991–1995), Šundov at first served as an Assistant Chief of Staff for Operations of the 4th Brigade of the National Guard (1991–1992), and later as its Commander (1992–1995). In 1995, Šundov become Deputy Commander and Chief of Staff of the Area Command Split. After the war, Šundov worked as Director of the Education Directorate CAF GS (1995–1996), Deputy Commander of the Area Command Ston (1996–1998), Commander of the Area Command Knin (1998–2000), Commandant of the Training Command (2001–2003), Commandant of the War College "Ban Josip Jelačić" (2003) in which he also served as a lecturer on module "Military Strategy and Operations, Commandant of the Joint Education and Training Command "Petar Zrinski" (2003–2007), Commandant of the Croatian Defense Academy "Petar Zrinski" (2007–2011),  Military Representative of Croatia to NATO and the EU (2011–2014), and Inspector General of Defense of Croatia (2014–2016). In 2016, President Kolinda Grabar-Kitarović and Prime Minister Tihomir Orešković named him Chief of the General Staff of Armed Forces of Croatia.

Decorations
 Order of Duke Branimir with Neck Ribbon
 Order of Nikola Šubić Zrinski
 Order of Ban Jelačić
 Order of the Croatian Trefoil
 Order of the Croatian Interlace
 Commemorative Medal of the Homeland's Gratitude for 5 years of honorable service
 Commemorative Medal of the Homeland's Gratitude for 10 years of honorable service
 Commemorative Medal of the Homeland's Gratitude for 15 years of honorable service
 Homeland War Memorial Medal
 Medal for Participation in Operation Storm
 Pistol, Commander of the 4th Brigade of the National Guard, 1992
 Commendation, President of the Republic of Croatia and Supreme Commander, 1992 and 1993

Personal life
Šundov is married to Marijana Šundov with whom he has two children, son Tomo and daughter Ivana. He speaks Croatian, English and Italian.

References

1962 births
Croatian army officers
Military personnel of the Croatian War of Independence
Living people
Order of Duke Domagoj recipients
University of Sarajevo alumni